Paul Vincent "Polly" Birch (January 4, 1910 – June 5, 1982) was an American basketball player and coach.  He coached the now-defunct Pittsburgh Ironmen of the Basketball Association of America (a forerunner of the National Basketball Association (NBA)) in 1946, and the NBA's Fort Wayne Pistons from 1951 through 1954.  Birch had played for the Pistons during the early 1940s, and the Youngstown Bears of the NBL.

References

External links
 BasketballReference.com: Paul Birch

1910 births
1982 deaths
All-American college men's basketball players
American men's basketball players
Basketball coaches from Pennsylvania
Basketball players from Pittsburgh
Duquesne Dukes men's basketball players
Fort Wayne Pistons head coaches
Fort Wayne Zollner Pistons players
Guards (basketball)
People from Homestead, Pennsylvania
Pittsburgh Ironmen coaches
Pittsburgh Pirates (NBL) players
Player-coaches
Sportspeople from Pittsburgh
Youngstown Bears coaches
Youngstown Bears players